Stucley or Stukley may refer to:

Stucley Baronets, an extant title in the Baronetage of the United Kingdom
George Stucley, 1st Baronet (1812–1900), a British Conservative Member of Parliament
Lewis Stukley (died 1620),  Vice-admiral of Devonshire and foe of Sir Walter Raleigh
Thomas Stucley (MP) (1620–1663), English politician and Royalist supporter in the English Civil War
Thomas Stukley (c. 1520 – 1578), English mercenary and Roman Catholic rebel against Queen Elizabeth I; allegedly an illegitimate son of King Henry VIII

See also
Stuckey (disambiguation)
Stukeley